Bouteloua megapotamica  is a species of grass in the genus Bouteloua, family Poaceae.  It has a disjunct distribution in Mexico, Brazil, Uruguay, Bolivia, Paraguay and Argentina.

References

megapotamica
Bunchgrasses of South America
Flora of Central America
Grasses of Argentina
Grasses of Brazil
Grasses of Mexico
Flora of Bolivia
Flora of Paraguay
Flora of Uruguay